Romani folklore encompasses the folktales, myths, oral traditions, and legends of the Romani people. The Romani were nomadic  when they departed India during the Middle Ages. They migrated widely, particularly to Europe, while other groups stayed and became sedentary. Some legends (often from non-Romani peoples) say that certain Romani have passive psychic powers such as empathy, precognition, retrocognition, or psychometry. Other legends include the ability to levitate, travel through astral projection by way of meditation, invoke curses or blessings, conjure or channel spirits, and skill with illusion-casting.

Romani folktales 
 Bald Pate
 Fedor and the Fairy, from A Book of Charms and Changelings
 Jack and His Golden Snuff-Box
 Mossycoat
 The Creation of the Violin
 The Captive's Tale and Circumcision
 The Foam Maiden, from A Book of Sorcerers and Spells
 The King of England and his Three Sons
 The Little Bull-Calf
 The Red King and the Witch
 The Yellow Dragon

Motifs in Romani folklore 

 Alako
 Bababiljos (male love deity)
 Baba Fingo (Saviour)
 Bear worship
 Beng (devil)
 Bibi
 Butyakengo
 Baro Kari: in Romani language meaning (Big Human Penis), see Shiva Lingam
 Bona (baptism)
 Biboldo (unbaptized) 
 Crystal ball
 Crystal gazing
 Curse
 Chindo (circumcised)
 Devla (universial God)
 Devleski Day (Mother Goddess)
 Dhampir
 Divination
 Dragon
 Đurđevdan
 I Gudli Saybiya (female Guardian angel)
 Fortune teller
 Gemstone
 Gitto Bach
 Horse worship
 Kakava (Spring feast)
 Moshto
 Mullo
 Palmistry
 Phallus worship
 Psychics
 Hamsa
 Household deity
 Ratcatcher
 Saintes-Maries-de-la-Mer
 Saint Sarah
 Shaktism
 Spells
 Suyolak
 Sunet Bijav (circumcision ceremony)
 Tarot
 Tasseography
 Trushul: The Romany word for "cross". It is likely from Trishula, Shiva's trident.
 Urmen
 Vampire
 Vampire pumpkins and watermelons
 Werewolves
 Witch

See also
Romani society and culture
Gypsy Lore Society
The Red King and the Witch: Gypsy Folk and Fairy Tales

References

Further reading

Folklore collections
 Ficowski, Jerzy; Borski, Lucia Merecka; Mikolaycak, Charles. Sister of the birds, and other Gypsy tales. Nashville: Abingdon, [1976].
 
 . Accessed August 25, 2021.

External links
Gypsy Folk Tales by Francis Hindes Groome [1899], at Sacred Texts.com
Gypsy Sorcery and Fortune Telling by Charles Godfrey Leland [1891], at Sacred Texts.com

 
Folklore
Folklore